Microcystina is a large genus of air-breathing land snails, terrestrial pulmonate gastropod mollusks in the subfamily Macrochlamydinae of the family Ariophantidae.

Species
 
 Microcystina angigyra Möllendorff, 1901
 Microcystina annamitica (Möllendorff, 1898)
 Microcystina appendiculata (Möllendorff, 1893)
 Microcystina arabii Marzuki, T. S. Liew & Mohd-Azlan, 2021
 Microcystina aruensis (Tapparone Canefri, 1880)
 Microcystina atoni Marzuki, T. S. Liew & Mohd-Azlan, 2021
 Microcystina bataiensis Vermeulen, Luu, Theary & Anker, 2019
 Microcystina bintennensis Godwin-Austen, 1899
 Microcystina bismarckiana Thiele, 1928
 Microcystina bourguignatiana (Mabille & Le Mesle, 1866)
 Microcystina brunii (Mörch, 1872)
 Microcystina brunnescens Vermeulen, 1996
 Microcystina callifera Vermeulen, Liew & Schilthuizen, 2015
 Microcystina cavernae Godwin-Austen, 1891
 Microcystina chionodiscus Vermeulen, 1996
 Microcystina circumlineata (Möllendorff, 1897)
 Microcystina clarkae Maassen, 2000
 Microcystina consobrina Van Benthem Jutting, 1959
 Microcystina cryptomphalus Godwin-Austen, 1882
 Microcystina exigua (Möllendorff, 1897)
 Microcystina exul Vermeulen, Luu, Theary & Anker, 2019
 Microcystina fruhstorferi (Möllendorff, 1897)
 Microcystina gerritsi van Bentham Jutting, 1964
 Microcystina gratilla van Benthem Jutting, 1950
 Microcystina harrietensis Godwin-Austen, 1882
 Microcystina infima (Mabille, 1887)
 Microcystina irregularis Möllendorff, 1902
 Microcystina kilat Marzuki, T. S. Liew & Mohd-Azlan, 2021
 Microcystina leucocystis Möllendorff, 1901
 Microcystina lirata Marzuki, T. S. Liew & Mohd-Azlan, 2021
 Microcystina lita Sykes, 1898
 Microcystina mansonensis Möllendorff, 1901
 Microcystina marginata Möllendorff, 1902
 Microcystina messageri Ancey, 1904
 Microcystina microrhynchus Vermeulen, Liew & Schilthuizen, 2015
 Microcystina minima (H. Adams, 1867)
 Microcystina mirmido (Dautzenberg, 1894)
 Microcystina moerchiana Godwin-Austen, 1882
 Microcystina muscorum Van Benthem Jutting, 1959
 Microcystina nana (Möllendorff, 1897)
 Microcystina obliquestriata Vermeulen, Luu, Theary & Anker, 2019
 Microcystina obscura Thiele, 1928
 Microcystina opaca Möllendorff, 1901
 Microcystina oswaldbrakeni Marzuki, T. S. Liew & Mohd-Azlan, 2021
 Microcystina paripari Marzuki, T. S. Liew & Mohd-Azlan, 2021
 Microcystina physotrochus Vermeulen, Liew & Schilthuizen, 2015
 Microcystina planiuscula Vermeulen, Liew & Schilthuizen, 2015
 Microcystina pudens Godwin-Austen, 1891
 Microcystina radioplicata B. Rensch, 1930
 Microcystina rinki (Mörch, 1872)
 Microcystina rowsoni Gittenberger & van Bruggen, 2013
 Microcystina rubiginosa van Benthem Jutting, 1958
 Microcystina schmackeriana (Möllendorff, 1883)
 Microcystina seclusa Godwin-Austen, 1891
 Microcystina sericata Vermeulen, Luu, Theary & Anker, 2019
 Microcystina shevaroyana W. T. Blanford, 1904
 Microcystina sicaveiensis (Heude, 1882)
 Microcystina stewarti Blanford, 1904
 Microcystina striatula Vermeulen, Liew & Schilthuizen, 2015
 Microcystina stuarti W. T. Blanford, 1904
 Microcystina subglobosa (Möllendorff, 1897)
 Microcystina sublimis (Hedley, 1897)
 Microcystina tongkingensis Möllendorff, 1901
 Microcystina trochiscus (Pfeiffer, 1861)
 Microcystina vernacula (Mabille, 1887)
 Microcystina vitreiformis (Möllendorff, 1897)
 Microcystina warnefordi Godwin-Austen, 1882

References

 Bank, R. A. (2017). Classification of the Recent terrestrial Gastropoda of the World. Last update: July 16, 2017

External links

 Mörch, O. A. L. (1872). Catalogue de Mollusques terrestres et fluviatiles des anciennes colonies danoises du golfe du Bengale. Journal de Conchyliologie. 20 (4): 303-327
 Iredale, T. (1941). A basic list of the land Mollusca of Papua. The Australian Zoologist. 10(1): 51-94, pls. 3-4

Ariophantidae